These are the Canadian number-one albums of 2007. The chart is compiled by Nielsen Soundscan and published by Jam! Canoe, issued every Sunday. The chart also appears in Billboard magazine as Top Canadian Albums.

See also
List of Canadian number-one singles of 2007
List of Hot 100 number-one singles of 2007 (Canada)

References

External links
Top 100 albums in Canada on Jam
Billboard Top Canadian Albums

2007
Canada albums
2007 in Canadian music